NMO may refer to:

 Neuromyelitis optica, also known as Devic's disease or Devic's syndrome
 N-Methylmorpholine N-oxide, an organic compound
 Nitronate monooxygenase, an enzyme
 Normal Move Out, in reflection seismology
 National Measurement Office, a government agency in the United Kingdom
  New Motorola, a mobile antenna connector
 COMMSTA NMO, a  United States Coast Guard Communication Station in Honolulu, Hawaii